Opinion polling for the 2016 Croatian parliamentary election started immediately after the 2015 general election. Monthly party ratings are conducted by Ipsos Puls and Promocija Plus.

Exit polls

Coalition standings
Poll results are listed in the table below in reverse chronological order, showing the most recent first, and using the date of publication, as opposed to the date the survey's fieldwork was done which can be seen in the second table. The highest percentage figure in each polling survey is displayed in bold, and the background shaded in the leading party's color. In the instance that there is a tie, then no figure is shaded. The lead column on the right shows the percentage-point difference between the two parties with the highest figures. When a specific poll does not show a data figure for a party, the party's cell corresponding to that poll is shown empty. The client can be seen in the second table.

Individual party standings

Seats projections

Polls of electoral districts

Coalition standings
The poll in the table below was conducted by Hendal for HRT from 16 to 26 August 2016:

The poll in the table below was conducted by Promocija plus for RTL and Jutarnji List in August and September 2016:

(*) It is commonly assumed on the basis of results from previous elections and past experience that HDZ will win a majority (if not all) of the 3 seats allocated to the XI electoral district made up of Croatian citizens living abroad. Should this be the case HDZ would have a total of 58 seats, with 56 being considered safe seats and raising its possible seat range to 56-63.

(**) The 11 remaining seats are allocated in the XI (3) and XII (8) electoral districts. The XI electoral districts encompasses all Croatian citizens living abroad. The XII electoral district encompasses members of 22 recognized national minorities who elected representatives in a single district with the votes being subsequently allocated to candidates running for every minority's individual seat. The Serb minority elects 3 members, while 1 seat each is allocated to the Italian, Hungarian, Czech/Slovak, Albanian/Bosniak/Macedonian/Montenegrin/Slovene and Austrian/Bulgarian/German/Jewish/Polish/Roma/Romanian/Rusyn/Russian/Turkish /Ukrainian/Vlach minorities.

Individual party standings
The poll in the table below was conducted by Promocija plus for RTL in May and June 2016:

References

Elections in Croatia
2016 in Croatia
Croatia
Opinion polling in Croatia
2016 elections in Croatia